Redman Hirahara Farmstead is a complex including a historic house designed by William Weeks (1897) and a vernacular barn in the Pajaro Valley, south of Watsonville, California. A Japanese American owned farm which was maintained by local citizens during the internment of Japanese Americans in World War II and was returned to the Hirahara family after the war, it is on the National Register of Historic Places.The barn included a living unit prior to the war and was expanded postwar to house other returning Japanese families.

History 
This Victorian house was designed by architect William Weeks, in 1897 for James Redman, who died in 1921. In 1937, it was sold for $69,575 to J. Katsumi Tao, a naturalized citizen and relative of the Hiraharas.  Tao sold it to Fumio Hirahara (age 16)  in 1940 for $10.00.

Pajaro Valley Japanese Americans were removed in 1942 under Executive Order 9066 and the Hiraharas were sent to Rohwer War Relocation Center in Arkansas. The Hirahara family returned from Arkansas on June 4, 1945 and reoccupied the property. However, for many Japanese-Americans, injustices continued after the war and many were unable to return to their prewar housing. Additions to the carriage barn on the Hirahara property were made in order to provide housing for other Japanese-Americans who did not have homes to which they could return.

House 

The house was constructed in 1897 and designed by William H. Weeks, who was responsible for the design of hundreds of unique buildings throughout California. It was a classic Queen Anne — it featured a rounded corner tower with a turret, gables with meticulously carved panels, Palladian windows and dentil molding.  The intricate detailing that Weeks designed for the exterior of the home could also be found inside — expensive and decorative wood, including eastern oak and bird's eye maple, were used for doors, mantels, and window casings.

Author and Hirahara descendant, Naomi Hirahara, describes a visit in the 1950s, “One favorite spot for all the grandchildren, grand-nephews, and grand-nieces was just on the side of the curved staircase on the first floor”.

Salvage Archaeology around the House was carried out in Summer of 2005 and reported on by Charr Simpson-Smith and Rob Edwards.The soil stratigraphy showed cultural strata interspersed with silt lenses of episodic flooding. The foundation for the front porch had been repaired, possibly after 1906 quake. The distribution of artifact categories indicated the greatest activity occurred at the back door(32), front door(7), side door (3) and side of house with no door (2) 

An extraordinary artifact was found near the back door, an "Imari industry" decorated bowl dated to the 1800s which would classify it as a “heritage’ item as the Hirahara family first occupied the Farmstead in the 1930s.

Carriage barn 

The barn was estimated to have been built around 1900, about the same time as the Victorian. The barn was 1 and ½ story with an attached lean to element. One small living unit  was built prewar. In this room between the layer of a 1937 newspaper and two upper layers of wallpaper, portions of the Japanese book The Autobiography of Osugi Sakae was nailed to the wall. Osugi Sakae (1885-1923) was a rebel, anarchist and martyr.

The carriage barn was expanded postwar to house other returning Japanese families.  Various wall treatments and linoleum support the existence of four apartments.

In popular culture 
In 2013, the writer Naomi Hirahara, describes the badly damaged house as the "Stem House" in the mystery novel Strawberry Yellow.

References 

Buildings and structures in Santa Cruz County, California
National Register of Historic Places in California
National Register of Historic Places in Santa Cruz County, California
Watsonville, California
W. H. Weeks buildings